The 309 members of the class 37 underwent many changes in their long career on British railways.  Under the TOPS system each change was reflected in a change of identity.  This table attempts to catalogue those changes.

Fleet list

See also
British Rail Class 37#Preservation for details, including liveries, of preserved locomotives

Notes

References

Bibliography
Ian Allan ABC of British Motive Power, several editions
British Rail Locomotives, Platform 5, several editions
Today's Railways monthly updates, Platform 5
 Kenny Barclay, British Rail in the 1980s and 1990s: Diesel Locomotives and DMUs, Amberley Publishing Limited, 2017 .
 Andrew Walker, Class 37 Locomotives, Amberley Publishing Limited, 2016 .

37 renumber
British railway-related lists
English Electric locomotives